Saints and Sinners is an American drama series that aired on NBC during the 1962-63 television season. The program starred Nick Adams as newspaper reporter Nick Alexander. Saints and Sinners was created by Adrian Spies, who worked as a journalist before becoming a screenwriter.

Overview
The character of Nick Alexander was first featured in The Dick Powell Show episode "Savage Sunday". The series showed New York City life through the eyes of the staff of a fictional newspaper, The New York Bulletin. The episodes' storylines had adult themes that featured moral dilemmas.

John Larkin co-starred as Nick's mentor, newspaper editor Mark Grainger. The series also starred Richard Erdman as Kluge, the staff photographer and office philosopher, and Robert F. Simon as copy editor Dave Tabak.

Many stars and future stars had guest roles on the show. One episode featured the final screen appearance of Paul Muni, one of the most esteemed actors in the history of Broadway and Hollywood.

Guest star list
 Philip Abbott
 Leon Askin
 Red Buttons
 Jack Albertson
 James T. Callahan
 Irene Dunne
 Sharon Farrell
 Tab Hunter
 Barbara Eden
 Ron Hagerthy
 Harvey Korman
 Robert Lansing
 Cloris Leachman
 Scott Marlowe
 Elizabeth Montgomery
 Paul Muni
 Charles Ruggles
 Barbara Rush
 Frank Sutton
 William Tannen
 Lurene Tuttle
 Ray Walston
 Simon Scott

Episodes

Season 1

Reception
Saints and Sinners faced competition from Chuck Connors' The Rifleman and Jack Lord's Stoney Burke on ABC and The Lucy Show and The Danny Thomas Show on CBS. Due to low ratings, it was canceled after 18 episodes.

References

External links
 

NBC original programming
1962 American television series debuts
1963 American television series endings
Black-and-white American television shows
1960s American drama television series
Television series about journalism
Television series by Four Star Television
Television series by 20th Century Fox Television
Television shows set in New York City
English-language television shows